Baş Əmirxanlı (also, Bash Emirkhanly and Bash Amirkhanli) is a village in the Davachi Rayon of Azerbaijan. The village contains a dwelling dating from the Middle Ages which is registered with the Ministry of Culture and Tourism.

References 

Populated places in Shabran District